"To Paichnidi Einai Pleon Diko Mou" (Greek:Το Παιχνίδι Είναι Πλέον Δικό Μου) is a CD single by popular Greek artist Thanos Petrelis released in December 2008 by Heaven Music. It supported by a Casino Rio advertisement, where the music video of the song "To Paichnidi Einai Pleon Diko Mou" was filmed, co-starring Phoebus and Olga Farmaki and directed by Manolis Tzirakis

Track listing

"To paichnidi einai pleon diko mou" - 4:29
"Na Hamogelas" - 3:21
"Efcharisto" - 3:02
"Xypna Thanasi" (remix) - 4:12

Credits and Personnel

Personnel
Giorgos Hatzopoulos - guitars
Telis Kafkas - electric bass
Vasilis Nikolopoulos - drums
Giannis Mpithikotsis - bouzouki, tzoura, baglama
Akis Diximos - second vocals
Victoria Halkiti - second vocals
Alex Panayi - second vocals, background vocals
Nektarios Georgiadis - background vocals
Phoebus - music, lyrics, programming, orchestration, keyboards, piano
Konstantinos Souvatzoglou - remix of "Ksipna Thanasi"

Production
Thodoris Hrisanthopoulos - digital mastering - transfer
Vaggelis Siapatis - sound
Phoebus - production management, mix

Design
Thodoris Psiahos - photos
Christos Sagkounis - artwork

Credits adapted from the album's liner notes.

References

2008 singles
2008 songs
Songs written by Phoebus (songwriter)
Heaven Music singles